Poison Season is the tenth studio album by Canadian indie rock band Destroyer, released on August 28, 2015 by Merge Records and Dead Oceans Records.

Release
The first song released from Poison Season, "Dream Lover", was posted on SoundCloud on May 21, 2015. The album's release date, track list, and artwork were announced the same day.

A second song from Poison Season, "Girl in a Sling", was released online on July 8, 2015. On the same day, the music video for "Girl in a Sling", directed by David Galloway, was released. The video cuts back and forth between shots of Bejar, who's working in a darkroom and singing in the shadows, and residential areas in decay. Director David Galloway explained in a press release that the video's tragic tone is meant to fit the album's overall vibe: 

A third song from Poison Season, "Times Square", was released on August 12, 2015 on SoundCloud. On August 27, 2015, a day before Poison Season's release, a stop motion music video for "Times Square", directed by Shayne Ehman, was released. The music video features Dan Bejar singing to the camera as a number of anthropomorphized forest friends rendered with stop-motion animation sing and dance along. The director, Shayne Ehman, described the process of making the video:

Critical reception

Poison Season received widespread critical acclaim from music critics upon its release. At Metacritic, which assigns a normalized rating out of 100 to reviews from mainstream critics, the album received an average score of 86, based on 26 reviews, indicating "universal acclaim".

Jayson Greene of Pitchfork gave the album a favorable review stating, "Poison Season retains the sumptuous melancholy of Kaputt, leavening it with the elegant swoon of Nelson Riddle-era Frank Sinatra. There are string arrangements all over Poison Season, and they are gorgeously recorded: the orchestra on "Girl in a Sling" sounds like 180-gram vinyl even while in earbuds. Destroyer has always partly been a nostalgia project, even when Bejar's nostalgia was decidedly ersatz—his records aim to stir the feelings that classic recordings arouse in us. Streethawk hearkened back to glam-rock Bowie even if the resemblance was off, and the magic of Kaputt was partly that of a peculiar and gnomic figure like Bejar conjuring the jaded romanticism of Bryan Ferry. On Poison Season, he visits a different section of his record collection, one that predates rock'n'roll, and he applies all the studied love and imagination to the endeavor we've come to expect from him."

Accolades

Track listing

Personnel
Daniel Bejar – MIDI, mixing, producer, vocals
John Collins – bass
Ted Bois – piano, Roland D50
Nicolas Bragg – electric guitar
Fabiola Carranza – cover photo
David Carswell – acoustic guitar, electric guitar, MIDI, mixing, producer
JP Carter – effects, trumpet
Maggie Fost – design
Dave Graham – engineer
Henry Lee – viola
Peggy Leo – cello
Jeff Lipton – mastering
Tyson Naylor – DX-7, piano
Erik Nielsen – assistant engineer
Dylan Palmer – contrabass
John Raham – editing, engineer, string mixing
Maria Rice – mastering engineer
Joseph Shabason – flute, saxophone
Stefan Udell – string arrangements
Josh Wells – bongos, congas, drums, percussion
Rebecca Whitling – violin
Jesse Zubot – arranger, editing, string mixing, viola, violin

Charts

References

External links
 Destroyer at Merge Records

2015 albums
Destroyer (band) albums
Dead Oceans albums
Merge Records albums
Albums produced by David Carswell